Erymanthos is a river in the western part of the Peloponnese in Greece. Its source is on the southern slope of the Mount Erymanthos, near the village Agrampela, Achaea. It flows towards the south through a rocky landscape and receives several small tributaries. The river flows into an area rich in pine trees and passes several small mountain villages including Tripotama. Beyond Tripotama it forms the border between Elis and Arcadia. It flows east of the Foloi oak forest. The river empties into the Alfeios 5 km west of the Ladon (river) confluence, near the village Tripotamia.

Places along the river
Plaka
Tripotama
Paralongoi
Achladini
Tripotamia

External links

Landforms of Achaea
Landforms of Arcadia, Peloponnese
Landforms of Elis
Rivers of Greece
Rivers of Western Greece
Rivers of Peloponnese (region)